A Twist in the Myth is the eighth studio album by the German power metal band Blind Guardian. It was originally set to be released on 5 September 2006 in Europe (which became the North American release date), but Nuclear Blast changed the release date to 1 September 2006.

The album was released in several different formats: a normal version, a digipak version with a bonus track and bonus CD, and a limited edition book-version. The book contains the digipak, along with a guitar pick, booklet and certificate of authenticity and autographs, as well as a dragon-shaped seal and a bar of red sealing wax.

Track listing 
All music written by André Olbrich and Hansi Kürsch. All lyrics written by Kürsch.

 "All the King's Horses" is also available on the single "Another Stranger Me".
 "Market Square" is the demo version of "Straight Through the Mirror" and is only available on the Double LP and Limited Book versions of the album.

Lyrical references 
 "This Will Never End" is inspired by Walter Moers' A Wild Ride Through the Night and tells of a meeting between the young illustrator Gustave Doré and the Grim Reaper who begins to doubt the existence of a divine masterplan and thus his own purpose.
 "Otherland" is based on Tad Williams' Otherland series of novels.
 "Turn the Page" is about the Wiccan ritual of renewal and change of seasons, dealing with the Horned God and also contains references to the historical shift from Paganism to Christianity.
 "Fly" contains references to Peter Pan and was inspired by the film Finding Neverland.
 "Carry the Blessed Home" is about Roland the Gunslinger and Jake Chambers at the end of Stephen King's Dark Tower series.
 "Another Stranger Me" is about a person with dissociative identity disorder who discovers his multiple personalities and tries to find a way out of his situation.
 "Straight through the Mirror" tells how dreams can change very quickly – it's about the importance of dreams in general too. Some claim it's about a person describing the experience and process of dying while in reality this person is just dreaming it all.
 "Lionheart" is about Ulysses and how he travels through Hades, but in this song he doesn't find the way out. Hansi took inspiration from French artist Gustave Dore and his illustrations of Dante's Inferno, whose main character, Dante the Pilgrim, meets Ulysses during his tour of Hell.
 "Skalds and Shadows" is sung from the point of view of an Old Norse Skald with an allusion towards the Saga of the Volsungs (specifically the story of Sigurd and Brunhilde) at the end.
 "The Edge" is about St. Paul and his faith in Jesus Christ as the incarnation of God and his belief in the imminent ending of the world ("This is the Edge now/It's all we're living for...")
 "The New Order" deals with the necessity of changes.
 "All the King's Horses" is based on Welsh folklore and the Arthurian cycle and features references to Taliesin and the Holy Grail.
 "Dead Sound of Misery" is a darker version of "Fly" in a different key with alternate lyrics and vocal melodies portraying a mythological vision of the Apocalypse.

Personnel
Band members
Hansi Kürsch – vocals
André Olbrich – lead guitar
Marcus Siepen – rhythm guitar
Frederik Ehmke – drums, percussion, flute and bagpipes

Guest Musicians
Oliver Holzwarth – bass guitar
The Choir Company – Olaf Senkbeil, Rolf Köhler, Thomas Hackmann
Martin G. Meyer and Pat Benzner – keyboards

Production
Charlie Bauerfeind – producing, mastering, mixing and engineering
Blind Guardian – producing
Jan Rubach – engineering
Marc Schettler – assistant engineering
Anthony Clarkson – artwork
Axel Jusseit – photos
Nikolay S. Simkin – booklet design

Chart positions 
 Germany: #4
 Sweden: #10
 Austria: #19
 Japan: #21
 USA Billboard Top Independent Albums: #21
 USA Billboard Top Heatseekers: #13
 Switzerland: #27
 Finland: #30
 Norway: #38
 Spain: #15
 UK: #33 (independent chart)

References

2006 albums
Blind Guardian albums
Nuclear Blast albums
Albums produced by Charlie Bauerfeind